King of Stories or Story King, also known as Gushi Dawang or King of Storytellers, official English title as Kingdom of Stories, is a Shanghai-based Chinese story magazine for elementary and junior high school students, founded by Shi Yanbing (施雁冰) in January 1983 in Shanghai.

History
King of Stories was founded by Shi Yanbing in Shanghai in January 1983.

It is supervised by Shanghai Century Publishing Company Limited, sponsored by Juvenile & Children's Publishing House (少年儿童出版社), and edited and published by the Editorial Department of King of Stories.

References

Chinese-language magazines
Magazines established in 1983
1983 establishments in China
Chinese children's literature
Magazines published in Shanghai
Monthly magazines published in China